Henri Alphonse Barnoin (7 July 1882 – 17 March 1940) was a French painter born in Paris in 1882.

Biography

Barnoin's father was an artist as were two of his uncles, and he studied art at the École des Beaux Arts in Paris. Although Barnoin initially studied with Luc-Olivier Merson, it was his second teacher, Émile Dameron, who became a more significant influence on his artistic style, attracting Barnoin to Impressionism. His work was part of the painting event in the art competition at the 1928 Summer Olympics.

He first exhibited his paintings at the Salon des Artistes de Paris in 1909. He continued to exhibit regularly at this annual Salon, winning a silver medal in 1921 and a gold medal in 1935. He chose to live in Concarneau in 1919, having been a frequent visitor to the port before the 1914–1918 war. There he opened a studio on the "Quai Pénéroff" which became a favourite meeting place for fellow artists all inspired by the light and animated scenes of fishing boats, village markets, and the sea. In 1926, Barnoin became official Artist to the French Navy. In addition to his oil paintings, he was a renowned pastellist, enjoying playing with the effect of light on a variety of scenes in a Post-Impressionist style. He died in Paris in 1940.
Among Barnoin's favored subjects were marine, harbour, and coastal scenes, mostly painted in the rich settings of Brittany. This is exemplified in his painting Fishing Harbour, Concarneau, Brittany.

Some of Barnoin's most famous works are A Brittany harbour, La promenade en barque, Pardon de St. Fiacre, Bretagne, and Debarqument de la pêche au Passage-Lanriec. See also gallery below. His work can be seen in the Musée du Faouet and the Musée des beaux-arts in Quimper, and at the Musée des beaux-arts in Brest.

The Musée de Faouët, a museum dedicated to showing the paintings of artists who had worked in Brittany, had a major retrospective of Henri Barnoin’s paintings in 2006.

Gallery

References

Further reading
 René Maurice, Trois artistes morbihannais: Arthur Midy, Henri Barnoin, Henri Moret, Imprimerie du Nouvelliste, Lorient, 1937
 Camille de Montergon, Histoire de Concarneau, Librairie E. Le Tendre, Concarneau, 1953
 Gérald Schurr and Pierre Cabanne, Dictionnaire des petits maîtres de la peinture, 2003
 Henri Belbeoch (preface by Jacques Foucart), Les peintres de Concarneau, Éditions Palantines, 1993
 Gérald Schurr, Le Guidargus de la peinture, Les Éditions de l'Amateur, 1996
 Emmanuel Bénézit, Dictionnaire des peintres, sculpteurs, dessinateurs, graveurs, vol. 1, Gründ, 1999
 André Cariou, Les peintres de Pont-Aven, Éditions Ouest-France, 1999
 Jean-Marc Michaud, Henri Barnoin, Éditions Le Télégramme, Brest (Finistère), 2006
 Bernard Frélaut, La merveilleuse Bretagne des peintres, Georges Nael Éditeur, 2006

External links
 

1882 births
1940 deaths
20th-century French painters
20th-century French male artists
French male painters
French Impressionist painters
Breton art
Olympic competitors in art competitions